Alligator Creek is a stream in the U.S. state of Georgia. It is a tributary to the Suwannee River.

Alligator Creek was named after the American alligator.

References

Rivers of Georgia (U.S. state)
Rivers of Clinch County, Georgia